La Mujer was the first Ecuadorian women's magazine, founded by Zoila Ugarte in 1905 with the subtitle "Revista Mensual de Literatura y Variedades".: It published: historical reviews, poetry, stories, political opinions and openly commented on the inequality of rights for women at the time.

History 
The first issue of the Journal appeared on April 15, 1905, with a length of 32 pages; the publications were anonymous and the editorial was written by the founder Zoila Ugarte; where she expressed her protest for the place of women in society, gender equity and above all access to education. Since the second issue, the name of the author was included in each article.

Only six issues of the magazine appeared, since on several occasions the printing press was closed at the request of various social sectors, especially the Catholic Church, because of their opposition to suffragette and feminist comments. Its last publication was in October 1905.

Contributors 
The most outstanding contributors to the magazine were

 Maria Natalia Vaca
 Mercedes González de Moscoso
 Isabel Donoso de Espinel
 Lastenia Larriva de Llona
 Ana Maria Albornoz
 Josephine Veintemilla
 Dolores Sucre
 Delia C. de Gonzalez

References 

Women's magazines